is a Japanese footballer who plays as a midfielder for Vegalta Sendai.

Playing career
Kudo was born in Miyagi Prefecture on May 31, 2000. He joined J1 League club Vegalta Sendai from youth team in 2018.

At Hannan University, he served as captain.

He will play for Vegalta Sendai from 2023.

Career statistics

Club
.

Notes

References

External links
 
 
 

2000 births
Living people
Association football people from Miyagi Prefecture
Japanese footballers
J1 League players
Vegalta Sendai players
Association football midfielders